Gregory Yeghikian (1880–24 January 1951) was an Iranian Armenian playwright, historian, and one of supporters of Pan-Iranist movement.

He was born in the Sivas Vilayet, studied in Istanbul and because of pressures of Ottoman Empire, he left Istanbul and went to different countries. In the beginning of the 20th century, he went to Iran and started to work as a principle in Gilan Province. Then he was recruited by Kuchik Khan, Iranian revolutionary and started to work as translator for him in the Nehzat-e Jangal (Jungle Movement). After being involved in the political movement, Yeghikian went to Tehran and started to write plays. Critics believe that Yeghikian had two different types of plays, historical plays and social plays. For example, his plays Fight Between East and West and Anooshiravan were his historical plays and Fear Square and Who is Guilty? were his social plays.

Works

Some of his plays 
 Fight Between East and West
 Anooshiravan
 Fear Square
 Who is Guilty?
 It can be Late, but Sweet
 Grand Horsewoman

His historic works 
 Soviet Union and the Jungle Movement

Iran-e Kabir 
Iran-e Kabir (Persian: ایران کبیر, romanized: Irān-e Kabir, lit. "Greater Iran") was a periodical published in the city of Rasht by the Armenian political activist Gregory Yeghikian. It advocated the unification of Iranian peoples (e.g., Afghans, Kurds, etc.) including the Armenians. Yaqikiān believed that, with education and the rising of the levels of people’s awareness, such a goal was feasible through peaceful means. The journal benefited from the contributions of a number of leading intellectuals of the time, including Moḥammad Moʿin and ʿAli Esfandiāri (Nimā Yušij), and carried articles, poetry, a serialized story, and some news. It also published articles in support of the Kurds who had risen in rebellion in Turkey, which caused the protest of the Turkish counsel in Rasht and led to the banning of the paper by the order of the minister of court. Yaqikiān tried, without success, to have the ban removed and eventually moved to Tehran, where he published the paper Irān-e Konuni.

References

Sources 

  
 
 

Iranian dramatists and playwrights
1880 births
1951 deaths
20th-century dramatists and playwrights
Iranian people of Armenian descent
Emigrants from the Ottoman Empire to Iran
Armenians from the Ottoman Empire
Iranian writers